Perspectives on Political Science is a quarterly peer-reviewed academic journal covering political philosophy. The journal was established in 1990 as a merger of Teaching Political Science (1973-1989) and Perspective (1972-1989). The journal is abstracted and indexed in Scopus.

References

External links

Online archive of Teaching Political Science
Online archive of Perspective

Routledge academic journals
English-language journals
Quarterly journals
Political science journals
Publications established in 1990
Political philosophy journals